Peter Frelinghuysen may refer to:
 Peter Frelinghuysen Jr., American politician and attorney
 Peter H. B. Frelinghuysen, his father, American lawyer and banker